The College of Optometrists in Vision Development (COVD) consists of optometrists, vision therapists, and other vision specialists.

Optometry & Vision Development is an official COVD peer reviewed publication. It is published four times a year and is an open access international journal that is available both online and in hard copy.

See also
American Academy of Optometry
Optometric Extension Program

References

External links

Optometry
Organizations established in 1971